Eulechria xeropterella is a moth of the family Oecophoridae. It is found in Australia in the Australian Capital Territory, New South Wales, Queensland, Victoria and Tasmania.

External links
Australian Insects 
Australian Faunal Directory

Oecophorinae